Telephone numbers in Indonesia have different systems for land lines and mobile phones: land lines use area codes, while mobile phones do not.

For land line area codes, the digit "0" is added in front when dialing domestic long distance from within Indonesia, but is always omitted when calling from abroad. Instead, callers would use the Indonesian country code +62, followed by the area code, without the "0". Domestic phone numbers in large cities have 8 digits, and in other areas 7 digits. Mobile phone numbers have a total of 10 to 12 digits for postpaid depending on the operator, whereas prepaid services get 11 to 13 digits determined by the operator.

Until October 1999, East Timor was included in the Indonesian telephone numbering plan, using the area codes 0390 (for Dili) and 0399 (for Baucau).

To make a phone call to Indonesia from abroad, the following formats are used:

For calls to landlines, callers dial +62, followed by the area code and subscriber's number, omitting the '0', hence a number in Jakarta would be dialled as +62 21-xxxx-xxxx. 
For calls to mobile wireless phone (GSM) from abroad, callers dial +62, followed by the subscriber's number, omitting the '0', hence +62 8xx-xxxx-xxxx

Overview

Numbers in business contact information
On business cards and other contact information, telephone numbers might be listed as "HP" or "hunting".  "HP" is an abbreviation for "hand phone" or mobile phone and is pronounced "hah péh".  Hand phones might also be referred to as pon-sel (short form of telepon seluler) or telepon genggam ("hold-in-the-hand telephone"). Hunting refers to an office line in which multiple individual lines are connected so that an incoming call can roll over to another line if the first line is busy.  This permits only one number to be published.

Operators
International call operators:
 PT Indosat: 101
 PT Telkom: 107
Domestic call operators: 100
International phone number information: 102
Local phone number information: 108

Phone number information in other area:
 106
 <Area code> 108.

International Direct Dialing Prefix
 PT Atlasat Solusindo (SLI-01018) : 01018 (ÁčČ)
 PT Gaharu Sejahtera (SLI-01019) : 01019
 PT XL Axiata Tbk (XL): 01000 (VoIP)
 PT Indosat Tbk: 001, 008 or 01016, 01088, 01089 (VoIP).
 PT Telkom: 007 or 01017, 01052 (VoIP).
 PT Smartfren Telecom: 01033 or 01068 (VoIP).
 Axis: 01012 (VoIP).

To make an International phone call from Indonesia you should use the following format:

<IDD prefix> <country code> <area code> <phone number>

Fixed CDMA Wireless
Numbering for FWA CDMA follows the PSTN rules (area code)-XXXX-XXXX. Which X depends on empty slot of numbering plan, and may vary between cities. But mostly, for Jakarta (and some of other Big City);
 PT Bakrie Telecom Tbk (Esia): (area code) 9XXX-XXXX, (021) 80XX-XXXX, (021) 83XX-XXXX
 PT Telkom Tbk (TelkomFlexi): (021) 70XX-XXXX, (021) 68XX-XXXX, (area code) 54XX-XXX, (area code) 70XX-XXX, (area code) 80XX-XXX, (area code) 81XX-XXX, (area code) 68XX-XXX, (area code) 3XXX-XXXX
 PT Indosat Tbk (StarOne): (021) 30XX-XXXX, (031) 60XX-XXXX, (area code) 61XX-XXX, (area code) 62XX-XXX, (area code) 63XX-XXX, (area-code) 90XX-XXXX
 PT Mobile-8 Telecom Tbk (Fren & Hepi): (area code) 50XX-XXXX, (area code) 21XX-XXXX, (area code) 31XX-XXXX

CDMA Mobile Wireless
 PT Smartfren Telecom : 0887-XXXX-XXXX, 0888-XXXX-XXXX, 0889-XXXX-XXXX
 PT Sampoerna Telekomunikasi Indonesia (Ceria/Net1): 0827-XXXX-XXXX, 0828-xxxx-xxxx
 PT Smart Telecom (Smart): 0881-XXXX-XXXX, 0882-XXXX-XXXX, 0883-XXXX-XXXX, 0884-XXXX-XXXX, 0885-XXXX-XXXX, 0886-XXXX-XXXX

GSM Mobile Wireless
 PT Indosat 
 IM3 (Prepaid and Postpaid) prefix: 0814, 0815, 0816, 0855, 0856, 0857, 0858.
 3 Indonesia (merged with Indosat) prefix: 0895, 0896, 0897, 0898, 0899.
 PT Telkomsel
 Telkomsel Halo (Postpaid), Telkomsel PraBayar (Prepaid), and by.U (MVNO) prefix: 0811, 0812, 0813, 0821, 0822, 0823, 0851, 0852, 0853. 
 PT XL Axiata
 XL Prepaid, XL Prioritas (Postpaid), and LIVE.ON (MVNO) prefix: 0817, 0818, 0819, 0859, 0877, 0878.
 AXIS (acquired by XL) prefix: 0831, 0832, 0833, 0838.
 PT Smartfren Telecom 
 Smartfren and Smartfren Power Up (MVNO) prefix: 0881, 0882, 0883, 0884, 0885, 0886, 0887, 0888, 0889.

Satellite Phone
 PT Telkom

Emergency number 
In Indonesia, emergency numbers are mostly using 11x format
 Police: 110
 Ambulance: 118 or 119
 Fire: 113
 Search and Rescue (BASARNAS): 115
 Mobile and satellite phone: 112

Calling formats 
To call in Indonesia, the following format is used:

xxx-xxxx Calls within an area code
+62
yyy-xxx-xxxx Calls inside Indonesia in city centers

+62 yyy-xxxx-xxxx Calls from outside Indonesia

+62 8nn-xxxx-xxxx Calls to mobiles from outside Indonesia

Area 2
These are area codes for the provinces of Jakarta, Banten, West Java, Yogyakarta, and Central Java.

Jakarta
All areas—021

Banten
Tangerang, South Tangerang—021
Lebak—0252
Pandeglang—0253
Cilegon, Serang—0254

West Java
Bekasi, Depok, parts of Bogor Regency—021
Bandung, Cimahi, parts of Sumedang (Jatinangor)—022
Cirebon—0231
Kuningan—0232
Majalengka—0233
Indramayu—0234
Bogor City, parts of Depok (Sawangan), parts of Bogor Regency—0251
Subang—0260
Sumedang—0261
Garut—0262
Cianjur—0263
Purwakarta—0264
Tasikmalaya, Ciamis, Banjar, Pangandaran Regency—0265
Sukabumi—0266
Karawang—0267

Central Java
Semarang, parts of Semarang Regency—024
Surakarta, Sragen, Karanganyar, Sukoharjo, parts of Boyolali—0271
Klaten—0272
Wonogiri—0273
Purworejo—0275
Boyolali—0276
parts of Cilacap—0280
Banyumas, Purbalingga—0281
Cilacap—0282
Tegal, Brebes—0283
Pemalang—0284
Pekalongan, Batang—0285
Banjarnegara, Wonosobo—0286
Kebumen—0287
Bumiayu—0289
Kudus, Jepara—0291
Grobogan—0292
Magelang, Temanggung—0293
Kendal, parts of Batang (Gringsing)—0294
Pati, Rembang—0295
Blora—0296
Karimun Jawa—0297
Salatiga, parts of Semarang Regency, parts of Boyolali—0298

Yogyakarta
All areas—0274

Area 3
These are area codes for the provinces of East Java, Bali, West Nusa Tenggara, and East Nusa Tenggara.

East Java
Surabaya, Gresik, Sidoarjo, Bangkalan—031
Mojokerto, Jombang—0321
Lamongan—0322
Sampang—0323
Pamekasan—0324
Bawean—0325
Masalembu Islands—0326
Kangean—0327
Sumenep—0328
Jember—0331
Bondowoso—0332
Banyuwangi—0333
Lumajang—0334
Probolinggo—0335
parts of Jember—0336
Situbondo—0338
Malang, Batu—0341
Blitar—0342
Pasuruan—0343
Madiun, Magetan, Ngawi—0351
Ponorogo—0352
Bojonegoro—0353
Kediri—0354
Tulungagung, Trenggalek—0355
Tuban—0356
Pacitan—0357
Nganjuk—0358

Bali
Denpasar, Badung, Gianyar, parts of Tabanan—0361
Buleleng—0362
Karangasem—0363
Jembrana—0365
Klungkung, Bangli—0366
parts of Tabanan (Baturiti)—0368

West Nusa Tenggara
Mataram, West Lombok, Central Lombok—0370
Sumbawa—0371
West Sumbawa—0372
Dompu—0373
Bima—0374
East Lombok—0376

East Nusa Tenggara
Alor Islands—0379
Kupang—0380
Ende—0381
Sikka—0382
East Flores—0383
Ngada—0384
Manggarai—0385
West Manggarai—0386
Sumba—0387
North Central Timor, South Central Timor—0388
Belu—0389

Area 4
These are area codes for the provinces of West Sulawesi, South Sulawesi, Central Sulawesi, South East Sulawesi, North Sulawesi, and Gorontalo.

South East Sulawesi
Kendari, parts of Konawe Regency—0401
Buton—0402
Muna—0403
Wakatobi—0404
Kolaka—0405
parts of Konawe Regency—0408

South Sulawesi
Pangkajene—0410
Makassar, Maros, Gowa—0411
Bantaeng, Bulukumba—0413
Selayar Islands—0414
Malino—0417
Takalar—0418
Jeneponto—0419
Enrekang—0420
Pare Pare, Pinrang, Sidenreng Rappang—0421
Tana Toraja—0423
Barru—0427
Luwu—0471
parts of Wajo Regency (Pitumpanua)—0472
North Luwu—0473
East Luwu—0474
parts of East Luwu Regency (Sorowako)—0475
Bone—0481
Sinjai—0482
Soppeng—0484
Wajo—0485

West Sulawesi
Majene—0422
Mamuju—0426
Polewali—0428
Central Mamuju—0429

Central Sulawesi
Morowali—0409
Buol—0445
Parigi Moutong—0450
Palu—0451
parts of Poso Regency—0452
Toli-Toli—0453
parts of Parigi Moutong Regency (Tinombo)—0454
parts of Parigi Moutong Regency (Moutong)—0455
Donggala—0457
parts of Poso Regency (Tentena)—0458
Banggai—0461
Banggai Island—0462
parts of Banggai Regency (Bunta)—0463
Tojo Una-Una—0464
North Morowali—0465

North Sulawesi
South Minahasa—0430
Manado, Tomohon, Minahasa, North Minahasa—0431
Sangihe Islands—0432
Talaud Islands—0433
Bolaang Mongondow  (incl. Kotamobagu)—0434
Kema, Kauditan, Bitung—0438

Gorontalo
Gorontalo—0435
North Gorontalo—0442
Pohuwato Regency—0443

Area 5
These are area codes for the provinces of West Kalimantan, Central Kalimantan, South Kalimantan, East Kalimantan, and North Kalimantan.

West Kalimantan
Ketapang—0534
Kayong Utara—0535
Pontianak—0561
Sambas, Bengkayang, Singkawang—0562
Landak—0563
Sanggau, Sekadau—0564
Sintang—0565
Kapuas Hulu—0567
Melawi—0568

Central Kalimantan
Kapuas, Pulang Pisau—0513
North Barito—0519
South Barito, East Barito—0526
Murung Raya—0528
East Kotawaringin—0531
West Kotawaringin, Sukamara,  -- 0532
Palangka Raya, Katingan—0536
Gunung Mas—0537
Seruyan—0538
Seruyan, parts of East Kotawaringin—0539

South Kalimantan
Banjarmasin, Banjar, Banjarbaru, Barito Kuala—0511
Tanah Laut—0512
Hulu Sungai Selatan, Hulu Sungai Tengah, Tapin—0517
Tanah Kambatang Lima, Tanah Bumbu—0518
Tabalong, Balangan—0526
Hulu Sungai Utara—0527

East Kalimantan
Samarinda, Kutai Kartanegara—0541
Balikpapan, Penajam North Paser—0542
Paser—0543
West Kutai—0545
Bontang—0548
East Kutai—0549
Berau—0554

North Kalimantan
Tarakan, Bunyu Island—0551
Bulungan, Tana Tidung—0552
Malinau—0553
Nunukan—0556

Area 6
These are area codes for the Provinces of Aceh and North Sumatra.

Aceh
Subulussalam—0627
Southeast Aceh—0629
Langsa, East Aceh, Aceh Tamiang—0641
Gayo Lues—0642
Central Aceh, Bener Meriah—0643
Bireuen—0644
Lhokseumawe, North Aceh—0645
parts of East Aceh—0646
Simeulue—0650
Banda Aceh, Aceh Besar, parts of Aceh Jaya (Lamno) -- 0651
Sabang—0652
Pidie, Pidie Jaya—0653
Aceh Jaya—0654
West Aceh, Nagan Raya—0655
South Aceh—0656
parts of South Aceh—0657
Singkil—0658
Southwest Aceh—0659

North Sumatra
Medan, Binjai, parts of Deli Serdang, parts of Serdang Bedagai (Perbaungan, Pantai Cermin), parts of Langkat—061
parts of Langkat (Pangkalan Brandan) -- 0620
Tebing Tinggi, Serdang Bedagai—0621
Pematang Siantar, Simalungun, Batubara, parts of Serdang Bedagai—0622
Asahan, Tanjungbalai, parts of Labuhan Batu (Labuhan Ruku) -- 0623
Labuhan Batu—0624
Parapat, parts of Samosir—0625
Samosir—0626
Dairi, Pakpak Bharat—0627
Karo, parts of Deli Serdang (Bandar Baru, Sibolangit) -- 0628
South Nias—0630
Central Tapanuli, Sibolga—0631
Toba Samosir—0632
North Tapanuli, Humbang Hasundutan—0633
South Tapanuli, Padang Sidempuan—0634
parts of South Tapanuli—0635
Mandailing Natal—0636
parts of Central Tapanuli (Barus)—0638
Nias—0639

Area 7
These are area codes for the Provinces of West Sumatra, Riau, Riau Islands, Jambi, South Sumatra, Bengkulu, Bangka-Belitung, and Lampung.

West Sumatra
Padang, Padang Pariaman, Pariaman, parts of South Pesisir—0751
Agam, Tanah Datar, Limapuluh Koto, Bukittinggi, Padang Panjang, Payakumbuh—0752
Pasaman, West Pasaman—0753
Sawahlunto, Sijunjung, Dharmasraya—0754
Solok, South Solok—0755
South Pesisir—0756
parts of South Pesisir—0757
Mentawai Islands—0759

Riau
Kuantan Singingi—0760
Pekanbaru, Pelalawan, parts of Siak, parts of Kampar—0761
Kampar, Rokan Hulu—0762
parts of Bengkalis—0763
Siak—0764
Dumai, parts of Bengkalis (Duri), parts of Rokan Hulu (Bagan Batu) -- 0765
Bengkalis—0766
Rokan Hulu—0767
Indragiri Hilir—0768
Indragiri Hulu—0769

Riau Islands
Muka Kuning Batamindo—0770
Tanjungpinang, Bintan—0771
Anambas Islands—0772
Natuna Islands—0773
Lingga—0776
Great Karimun—0777
Batam—0778
Kundur—0779

Jambi
Jambi, Muaro Jambi—0741
West Tanjung Jabung—0742
Batanghari—0743
Tebo—0744
Sarolangun—0745
Merangin—0746
Bungo, parts of Tebo (Rimbo Bujang) -- 0747
Kerinci—0748

South Sumatra
Empat Lawang—0702
Palembang, Ogan Ilir, Banyuasin—0711
Ogan Komering Ilir—0712
Prabumulih, parts of Muara Enim—0713
Musi Banyuasin—0714
Pagar Alam, parts of Lahat—0730
Lahat—0731
Lubuklinggau, Musi Rawas—0733
Muara Enim—0734
Ogan Komering Ulu—0735

Bangka-Belitung
parts of Bangka (Belinyu) -- 0715
West Bangka—0716
Bangka, Pangkal Pinang—0717
Central Bangka, South Bangka—0718
Belitung—0719

Bengkulu
Rejang Lebong, Kepahiang—0732
Bengkulu, Seluma—0736
North Bengkulu, Muko-muko—0737
South Bengkulu, Kaur—0739

Lampung
Bandar Lampung, parts of South Lampung—0721
Tanggamus—0722
Way Kanan—0723
North Lampung—0724
Metro, Central Lampung, East Lampung—0725
Tulang Bawang—0726
South Lampung—0727
West Lampung—0728
Pringsewu Regency—0729
part of Tanggamus—084

Area 9
These are area codes for the provinces of Maluku, North Maluku, Papua, Central Papua, Highland Papua, South Papua, Southwest Papua, and West Papua.

Maluku
Banda Naira—0910
Ambon—0911
Namlea—0913
Masohi—0914
Tual—0916
Dobo—0917
Saumlaki—0918

North Maluku
Weda—0920
Ternate—0921
Tobelo—0924
Tidore—0929

West Papua
Kaimana, Fak Fak—0956
Manokwari—0986

Southwest Papua
Sorong—0951

Papua
Biak—0981
Jayapura—0967
Nabire—0984
Serui—0963
Sarmi—0966
Yapen—0983

Highland Papua
Wamena—0969

Central Papua
Tembagapura—0979
Timika—0901

South Papua
Agats—0902
Boven Digoel—0975
Merauke—0971

See also
Communications in Indonesia

References

ITU allocations list

Indonesia
Indonesia communications-related lists
Telecommunications in Indonesia